HMS Providence was a reciprocating engine-powered  during the Second World War. Laid down as HMCS Forrest Hill for the Royal Canadian Navy she was transferred on completion to the Royal Navy as HMS Providence. She survived the war and was scrapped in 1958.

Design and description
The ships' complement consisted of 85 officers and ratings.

The reciprocating ships had two vertical triple-expansion steam engines, each driving one shaft, using steam provided by two Admiralty three-drum boilers.

The Algerine class was armed with a QF  Mk V anti-aircraft gun and four twin-gun mounts for Oerlikon 20 mm cannon. The latter guns were in short supply when the first ships were being completed and they often got a proportion of single mounts. By 1944, single-barrel Bofors 40 mm mounts began replacing the twin 20 mm mounts on a one for one basis. All of the ships were fitted for four throwers and two rails for depth charges.

Construction and career
Providence was ordered as HMCS Forrest Hill in 1942, and laid down at the Toronto yards of Redfern Construction Ltd on 17 July 1943. She was renamed Providence in June 1943, and was launched on 27 October 1943.  Her conversion to a minesweeper was completed on 15 May 1944.  She served during the last years of the Second World War.

After the war, Providence participated in the Palestine Patrol.  On 1 November 1946, she escorted the listing merchant vessel , full of Jewish refugees, into Haifa.  On 10 December, Providence participated in the rescue of more refugees from the shipwrecked , which had grounded in Syrna.

Providence was subsequently sold for scrapping, and arrived at the yards of Young, of Sunderland on 17 May 1958.

References

Bibliography
 

 Peter Elliott (1977) Allied Escort Ships of World War II. MacDonald & Janes,

External links
HMS Providence at uboat.net

 

Algerine-class minesweepers of the Royal Navy
Ships built in Ontario
1943 ships
World War II minesweepers of the United Kingdom